Julius Ansah (born 1950) is a Ghanaian judge who served as a Justice of the Supreme Court of Ghana from 2004 to 2020.

Ansah was nominated to the Supreme Court of Ghana by John Kufuor, who was then the President of Ghana. He was sworn in by John Kufuor in October 2004 along with two other new Supreme Court judges, Felix Michael Lartey and Richard Twum Aninakwah. As the most senior judge at the time, he acted as the Chief Justice of Ghana between 20 December 2019 and 7 January 2020 following the retirement of Sophia Akuffo as the Chief Justice. Kwasi Anin-Yeboah succeeded Sophia Akuffo as the next Chief Justice. 
During 2018 when he also served as the acting Chief Justice, he wrote a letter of apology to nine judges whose homes were to be affected by the National Cathedral Project envisaged by the Government of Ghana. Two of the affected judges, Mariama Owusu and Lovelace Johnson later joined him on the Supreme Court in December 2019.

See also
List of judges of the Supreme Court of Ghana
Supreme Court of Ghana

References

Date of birth missing (living people)
Living people
Justices of the Supreme Court of Ghana
1950 births
20th-century Ghanaian judges
21st-century Ghanaian judges